George Thomas Baker (born April 25, 1970) is an American art historian of modern and contemporary art. He is especially known for his writings on photography. He is a professor of art history at the University of California, Los Angeles and an editor of the journal October.  Reviewing a book that Baker wrote on Dada, Merlin James wrote "What Baker really offers, perfectly reasonably, is high-end, post-modern theorising, with just a touch of unconventionality in honour of his subject’s way-outness."

Biography
Baker studied art history at Yale University and received his Ph.D. from Columbia University, also studying at the Whitney Independent Study program in New York. While at Columbia his advisors were Rosalind E. Krauss and Benjamin H. D. Buchloh. He edited an October Book on James Coleman, published in 2003, and has published The Artwork Caught by the Tail: Francis Picabia and Dada in Paris in 2007.  He is also a critic of contemporary art, a contributor to Artforum magazine, he has written essays on the work of artist Paul Chan amongst others. In 2008 he participated in the conference Canvases and Careers Today at the Städelschule in Frankfurt am Main, that was subsequently published as a book, delivering a paper called "Late Criticism".

In 2009, Baker led an attempt to save the fine arts library on the UCLA campus, launching a Facebook page and an online petition.

The Artwork Caught by the Tail: Francis Picabia and Dada in Paris
The Artwork Caught by the Tail: Francis Picabia and Dada in Paris under MIT Press is  Baker's study of Francis Picabia. Baker attends to Picabia's productive innovation in the Paris Dada moment, showing that it was through form that Picabia remade modernism from the medium up. The book contains five chapters.

References

External links
 UCLA Faculty: George Baker
 The MIT Press: George Baker
 For the book:
MIT Press
artcritical
amazon
goodreads

American art historians
University of California, Los Angeles faculty
Living people
Yale College alumni
Columbia University alumni
Historians of photography
1970 births
21st-century American historians
21st-century American male writers
Historians from California